The following is a list of notable events and releases of the year 1934 in Norwegian music.

Events

Deaths

 November
 21 – Mon Schjelderup, composer and pianist (born 1870).

Births

 January
 24 – Egil «Bop» Johansen, jazz drummer, teacher, composer (died 1998).

 December
 5 – Kåre Grøttum, jazz pianist, composer, music arranger, and program presenter in NRK.

 Unknown date
 Siss Hartmann, singer (died 2011)

See also
 1934 in Norway
 Music of Norway

References

 
Norwegian music
Norwegian
Music
1930s in Norwegian music